Exallosperma is a genus of flowering plants belonging to the family Rubiaceae.

Its native range is Madagascar.

Species:
 Exallosperma longiflora De Block

References

Rubiaceae
Rubiaceae genera